San Pedro de Quemes is the second municipal section of the Nor Lípez Province in the Potosí Department in Bolivia. Its seat is San Pedro de Quemes.

Geography 
The municipality lies at the Uyuni salt flat.

Some of the highest mountains of the municipality are listed below: 

Many of the mountains and volcanoes are a natural border to Chile.

Subdivision 
The municipality consists of the following cantons:
 Cana - 44 inhabitants (2001)
 Chiguana - 10 inhabitants
 Pajancha - 52 inhabitants
 Pelcoya - 135 inhabitants
 San Pedro de Quemes- 574 inhabitants

The people 
The people are mainly not indigenous and 45,0% are citizens of Quechua descent.

See also 
 Ch'iyar Quta

References

External links 
San Pedro de Quemes Municipality: population data and map

Municipalities of Potosí Department